Gongora cassidea is a species of orchid found in Mexico, Belize, Guatemala, El Salvador, Honduras, Nicaragua and Costa Rica.

References

cassidea
Orchids of Belize
Orchids of Central America
Orchids of Costa Rica
Orchids of Guatemala
Orchids of Honduras
Orchids of Mexico
Orchids of Nicaragua